Molliens-au-Bois is a commune in the Somme department in Hauts-de-France in northern France.

Geography

History
During the Battle of Amiens in August 1918, the divisional HQ of the U.S 33rd Infantry Division was set up in the chateau at Molliens-au-Bois. During that period, King George V went to the castle and awarded medals to General Pershing and other troops. General Bell was the C.O of the division.

On the night of August 8–9, 1918, as three Battalions of Doughboys from the 33rd U.S. Division were joining the Allied offensive during the Battle of Amiens, American war poet Lieut. John Allan Wyeth and Lieut. Thomas J. Cochrane were assigned to deliver sealed orders from Division HQ at Molliens-au-Bois to the Field Headquarters of all three Battalions engaged in the attack. The location of each Battalion was unknown, but they were believed to be along the northern bank of the Somme River, near the village of Sailly-le-Sec. Wyeth would later describe the mission in detail in his six interlinked "Chipilly Ridge sonnets."

Population

See also
Communes of the Somme department

References

External links

 World War I and Molliens-au-Bois

World War I sites in France
Communes of Somme (department)